France Mihelič (27 April 1907 – 1 August 1998) was a Slovene painter, one of the key figures in Slovene painting in the second half of the 20th century, known for his surrealist figurative paintings and prints.

Mihelič was born in Virmaše near Škofja Loka in 1907. He studied art at the Zagreb Academy of Fine Arts between 1927 and 1931. He received the Prešeren Award three times, in 1949 for his paintings Kolona v snegu and Vaška ječa, in 1955 for his graphic opus and in 1965 for the set and puppets for a puppet performance of Sinja ptica (Bluebird) staged in 1964 at the Ljubljana Puppet Theatre.

He won the Levstik Award for his book illustrations four times: in 1949 for his illustrations of Prežihov Voranc's book Solzice (Lillies of the Valley), in 1951 for Fran Levstik's Najdihojca, in 1952 for France Bevk's Pestrna (Child Minder) and in 1956 for Mira Mihelič's Štirje letni časi (The Four Seasons).

In 1978 he also won the Jakopič Award for his life achievement in painting.

He was married to the writer and translator Mira Mihelič.

References

Slovenian male painters
Slovenian illustrators
1907 births
1998 deaths
Levstik Award laureates
Prešeren Award laureates
Jakopič Award laureates
People from the Municipality of Škofja Loka
Academy of Fine Arts, University of Zagreb alumni
Slovene surrealist artists
20th-century Slovenian painters
20th-century Slovenian male artists